Levisham is a small village and civil parish in the Ryedale district of North Yorkshire, England, located within the North York Moors National Park about  north of Pickering. At the 2011 Census the population was less than 100. Details are included in the civil parish of Lockton.

History
The village is recorded as a very small settlement in the Domesday Book of 1086. The name of the village was first recorded in 1086 as Leuecen, and it derives from Old Norse, meaning the farmstead of Leofgeat's people. The village is believed to have moved location due to the Black Death in the 14th century. The Church of St Mary, a grade II* listed building which dates to the 11th century, is now isolated from the current village, and is thought to mark the site of a Deserted Medieval Village.

Locations
It has a station on the North Yorkshire Moors Railway. Nearby villages include Newton-on-Rawcliffe and Lockton.

Demographics
At the 2011 census, details were recorded with the parish of Lockton, however, an estimate by North Yorkshire County Council in 2015 stated that the population was 70.

Miscellaneous
Heartbeat actress Lisa Kay (nurse Carol Cassidy) is from Levisham.
In April 2021 the village was used as a filming location for the forthcoming Mission: Impossible – Dead Reckoning Part One film.

References

External links

 Levisham and Lockton Past and Present

Villages in North Yorkshire
Civil parishes in North Yorkshire